A young adult is generally a person in the years following adolescence. Definitions and opinions on what qualifies as a young adult vary, with works such as Erik Erikson's stages of human development significantly influencing the definition of the term; generally, the term is often used to refer to adults in approximately the age range of 18 to 39 years, with some more inclusive definitions extending the definition into the early to mid 40s. The young adult stage in human development precedes middle adulthood.

In the literary business, the term young adult is very often misused informally or in a literary sense to refer to books targeted at children down to ages 12 or 13 due to the category of young adult literature targeting this demographic in the lower age limit. This broad extension of young adult to minors has been greatly disputed, as they are not considered adults by the law or in any other cultures outside of religion (such as the Bar or Bat Mitzvah in Judaism), and the tradition of biological adulthood beginning at puberty has become archaic.

Time co-ordinates
For a variety of reasons, timelines on young adulthood cannot be exactly defined—producing different results according to the different mix of overlapping indices (legal, maturational, occupational, sexual, emotional and the like) employed, or on whether 'a developmental perspective... [or] the socialization perspective is taken. 'Sub-phases in this timetable of psycho-social growth patterns... are not rigid, and both social change and individual variations must be taken into account'—not to mention regional and cultural differences. Arguably indeed, with people living longer, and also reaching puberty earlier, 'age norms for major life events have become highly elastic' by the twenty-first century.

Some have suggested that, after Pre-adulthood... in the first 20 years or so... the second era, Early Adulthood, lasts from about age 17 to 45... the adult era of greatest energy and abundance and of greatest contradiction and stress.' Within that framework, 'the Early Adult Transition (17–22) is a developmental bridge between pre-adulthood and early adulthood', recognizing that 'the transition into adulthood is not a clear-cut dividing line'. One might alternatively speak of 'a Provisional Adulthood (18–30)... [&] the initiation to First Adulthood' as following that. Alternatively, MIT has generally defined "young adulthood" as 18 to 22 or 25, although this is likely to align with the typical age range of college students.

Despite all such fluidity, there is broad agreement that it is essentially the twenties and thirties which constitute Early adulthood... the basis for what Levinson calls the Dream—a vision of his [or her] goals in life which provide motivation and enthusiasm for the future.'

Health
Young/prime adulthood can be considered the healthiest time of life and young adults are generally in good health, subject neither to disease nor the problems of senescence. Strength and physical performance reach their peak from 18 to 39 years of age. Flexibility may decrease with age throughout adulthood.

The female reproductive system reaches its peak fertility during the early 20s.

Of women who want to become pregnant,
At age 30
75% will have a conception ending in a live birth within one year
91% will have a conception ending in a live birth within four years.
At age 35
 66% will have a conception ending in a live birth  within one year
 84% will have a conception ending in a live birth within four years.
At age 40
44% will have a conception ending in a live birth  within one year
64% will have a conception ending in a live birth within four years.

In developed countries, mortality rates for the 18–40 age group are typically very low. Men are more likely to die at this age than women, particularly in the 18–25 group: reasons include car accidents and suicide. Mortality statistics among men and women level off during the late twenties and thirties, due in part to good health and less risk-taking behavior.

Regarding disease, cancer is much less common in young than in older adults. Exceptions are testicular cancer, cervical cancer, and Hodgkin's lymphoma. 

In sub-Saharan Africa, HIV/AIDS has hit the early adult population particularly hard. According to a United Nations report, AIDS has significantly increased mortality of between ages 20 to 55 for African males and 20 to 45 for African females, reducing the life expectancy in South Africa by 18 years and in Botswana by 34 years.

Erik Erikson's theories of early adulthood
According to Erik Erikson, in the wake of the adolescent emphasis upon identity formation, 'the young adult, emerging from the search for and insistence on identity, is eager and willing to fuse their identity with that of others. He [or she] is ready for intimacy, that is, the capacity to commit... to concrete affiliations and partnerships.' To do so means the ability 'to face the fear of ego loss in situations which call for self-abandon: in the solidarity of close affiliations, in orgasms and sexual unions, in close friendships and in physical combat'. Avoidance of such experiences 'because of a fear of ego-loss may lead to a deep sense of isolation and consequent self-absorption'.

Where isolation is avoided, the young adult may find instead that 'satisfactory sex relations... in some way take the edge off the hostilities and potential rages caused by the oppositeness of male and female, of fact and fancy, of love and hate'; and may grow into the ability to exchange intimacy, love and compassion.

In modern societies, young adults in their late teens and early 20s encounter a number of issues as they finish school and begin to hold full-time jobs and take on other responsibilities of adulthood; and 'the young adult is usually preoccupied with self-growth in the context of society and relationships with others.' The danger is that in 'the second era, Early Adulthood... we must make crucially important choices regarding marriage, family, work, and lifestyle before we have the maturity or life experience to choose wisely.'

While 'young adulthood is filled with avid quests for intimate relationships and other major commitments involving career and life goals', there is also "a parallel pursuit for the formulation of a set of moral values". Erikson has argued that it is only now that what he calls the 'ideological mind' of adolescence gives way to 'that ethical sense which is the mark of the adult.'

Reaching adulthood in modern society is not always a linear or clean transition. As generations continue to adapt, new markers of adulthood are created that add different social expectations of what it means to be an adult.

Daniel Levinson's Theory of Adult Development

Daniel Levinson argued that developmental sequences continue to occur as we transition into adulthood. Levinson's theory centers around Erik Erikson's conception of life courses. This theory of Erikson includes patterns and relationships of events for the person's life that distinguishes them. The study of the life courses covers all aspects of the life relationships, internal and external feelings, bodily changes, and the good and bad times that are experienced. Preadulthood, Early Adulthood, Middle Adulthood, and Late Adulthood are the four eras that constitute the life course. Preadulthood begins with conception and continues to roughly the age of 22. During these years the person grows from being extremely dependent and undifferentiated to being a more independent responsible adult. This is the era that we see the most biopsychosocial growth. The Early Adulthood Transition is part of this first stage while also being a part of the second stage, this is from the age of 17 to 22. Here is when the preadulthood era begins to draw to a close and the transition to early adulthood begins. It is here that the individual begins to modify their relationship from the preadult world so that they fit better to the adult world they are creating. The second era Early adulthood begins at age 17 and goes till 45. It begins during the early adulthood transition, and has the greatest amount of energy, contradiction and stress. This is typically the time for forming and pursuing aspirations, finding a place in society, forming families and as the era ends establishing a solid position in the adult world. The third period (Middle Adulthood) begins at age 45 and goes till 65, here we begin to see a decline in our biological capacities, the decline is not enough to completely deplete us of the energy we had during early adulthood and it allows for us to continue to have a socially valuable life. The final era is late adulthood this begins with age 65 and goes till death. In this era the individual has to find a new balance between involvement with society and the self. The individual is experiencing more fully the process of dying and here should be given the ability to freely choose the mode of life.

Settling down
After the relative upheaval of the early 30s, the middle to late 30s are often characterized by settling down: 'the establishment phase', involving 'what we would call major life investments—work, family, friends, community activities, and values.' With the making of the major investments in life the individual makes deeper commitments investing more of himself to these commitments he's made. What has been termed 'the Culminating Life Structure for Early Adulthood (33–40) is the vehicle for completing this era and realizing our youthful aspirations.' People in their thirties may increase the financial and emotional investments they make in their lives, and may have been employed long enough to gain promotions and raises. They often become more focused on advancing their careers and gaining stability in their personal lives—'with marriage and child-rearing,' starting a family, coming to the fore as priorities.

Gail Sheehy, however, signposts the same twenties/thirties division rather differently, arguing that nowadays 'the twenties have stretched out into a long Provisional Adulthood', and that in fact 'the transition to the Turbulent Thirties marks the initiation to First Adulthood.'

Midlife transition

Young Adulthood then draws to its close with 'the Midlife Transition, from roughly age 40 to 45'—producing 'a brand-new passage in the forties, when First Adulthood ends and Second Adulthood begins.' It is here in this Midlife Transition that we often find there is an ending of early adulthood as well as individuals making changes in their lives, with the biggest change being the career they are in. Early adulthood can be seen as ended as a person stops seeking adult status or wanting to feel like an adult. By the time we reach the midlife transition we move from talking about how old we are to bolster our reputation and emphasize how young they are.  In the midlife transition individuals start to focus on the things that become important in their lives that effect their personal lives. Those individuals focus more on the present than the future and the past. Levinson thought midlife to be a time of development of crisis. However, research today in the United States shows that individuals do not experience a midlife crisis. Instead individuals report midlife to be a freeing and satisfying period of life. An important thing to consider as we go through the midlife transition is the physical changes that we experience (outside of the changes that occur to the individual's character). Body image is an important aspect of the physical changes that are often experienced, and midlife transition may necessitate changes to one's perceived body image.

Here in the Midlife transition the issue isn't whether the individual has achieved or failed in accomplishing the goals they formed in the previous era. Rather the issue at hand is what the individual should be doing with the experience of disparity between one's goals and one's outcomes. In this transitional period from early adulthood to middle adulthood,  the changes we make tend to focus less on the self and more on the relationships that we have.

See also

 Emerging adulthood
 Quarter-life crisis
 Twixter
 Young adult fiction
 Young professional
 Youth culture
 Youth engagement
 Youth politics
 Youth rights
 Youth suicide
 Youth

References

Notes

 Erikson, Erik H. (1982). The Life Cycle Completed. W. W. Norton. 
 

 
Human development
Youth
Human life stages